"Aquí Está Tu Caldo" is a song by Puerto Rican reggaeton singer-songwriter Daddy Yankee from the 2004 compilation album La Trayectoria. The song was produced by Luny Tunes.

Charts

References

2004 singles
Daddy Yankee songs
2004 songs
Songs written by Daddy Yankee